Wee Siew Kim (born 19 August 1960) is a Singaporean former politician. A member of the People's Action Party, he was a Member of the Parliament of Singapore representing the Ang Mo Kio Group Representation Constituency (Jalan Kayu) from 25 October 2001 to 19 April 2011.

Wee was educated at Raffles Institution, followed by the Imperial College of Science and Technology in London Bachelor of Science (Aeronautical Engineering) (Hons), followed by an MBA at Stanford University.

Currently, he is a member of the board of directors (non-executive & independent) of SBS Transit. He is also Director of Changi Airports International Pte Ltd. He is currently Group CEO, NIPSEA Group of Companies.

Wee was previously the deputy CEO (Aerospace and Marine) and concurrent president, Defence Business of Singapore Technologies Engineering Ltd.

Personal life
Wee is a Buddhist. Wee is married and has 4 children.

In October 2006, one of Wee's daughters, Wee Shu Min, was in the news for posting on her blog what is viewed by some Singaporeans to be elitist, naive and insensitive statements against heartlanders.

Career
2009–present Group CEO, NIPSEA Group of Companies 
2004–2009 	   Deputy CEO & President, Defence Business, ST Engineering 
2002–2004 	   President, Defence Business, ST Engineering 
2001–2002 	   President, ST Engineering – Europe 
1984–2001 	   Engineer, Snr Engineer, Manager, VP, SVP, Dy President, President of Singapore Technologies Aerospace

Wee is a Fellow of the City and Guilds Institute.

References

External links
 Wee Siew Kim's profile on Parliament of Singapore

Singaporean people of Chinese descent
Living people
1960 births
Members of the Parliament of Singapore
People's Action Party politicians
Singaporean Buddhists
Raffles Institution alumni
Alumni of Imperial College London
Stanford Graduate School of Business alumni